Morichal Largo River is a river in the North eastern part of Venezuela. It is part of the Orinoco River basin.

See also
List of rivers of Venezuela

References
Rand McNally, The New International Atlas, 1993.

Rivers of Venezuela